"Time for Me to Fly" is a song by American rock band REO Speedwagon, released in 1978 as the second single from the album You Can Tune a Piano, but You Can't Tuna Fish. It was written by lead singer Kevin Cronin and took 10 years to write. The song originally reached number 56 on the Billboard Hot 100, but later reached number 34 on the Digital Songs chart after being used in Netflix's Ozark. It also reached number 90 on the Canadian charts.   The song has a BPM of 81 BPM and plays in 4/4 time signature. Cash Box praised the "melodic singing and acoustic guitar work...enveloping chorus and...catchy lyric." Record World said that it is "characteristic of the group's imaginative use of rock's common raw materials."

Cronin said: 

Cronin also said: 

Dolly Parton also recorded the song for her 1989 album, White Limozeen.

In 2021, REO Speedwagon's home state of Illinois used the song as "Time for Me to Drive" for a tourism campaign.

Charts

References

External links
 

1978 songs
1978 singles
REO Speedwagon songs
Epic Records singles
Rock ballads
Songs written by Kevin Cronin
Song recordings produced by Kevin Cronin
Song recordings produced by Gary Richrath
CBS Records singles